Piz da las Clavigliadas is a mountain of the Swiss Silvretta Alps, located north of Guarda in the canton of Graubünden. It lies between the valleys of Val Tuoi and Val Tasna, south of the Dreiländerspitze.

References

External links
 Piz da las Clavigliadas on Hikr

Mountains of the Alps
Mountains of Switzerland
Mountains of Graubünden
Scuol